Marzuki Badriawan (born 20 October 1967) is a former Indonesian footballer who played as defender for Mitra Surabaya, Persekabpas Pasuruan and the Indonesia national team.

References

External links

1967 births
Association football defenders
Living people
Indonesian footballers
Indonesia international footballers
Persekabpas Pasuruan players
Mitra Surabaya players
Indonesian Premier Division players
Place of birth missing (living people)
20th-century Indonesian people